The Trigger Complex is the tenth studio album by American punk rock band T.S.O.L. (True Sounds of Liberty). It was released in 2017 under the Rise label and produced by Paul Roessler.

Overview
The Trigger Complex has been described as "melodic", "anthemic", and "simplistic" with a classic rock-inspired sound. The album is reminiscent of early-80s punk and goth bands including The Damned, Billy Idol, The Cult and Social Distortion.

Reception
The album received mixed to positive reviews from music critics. Punk News said there was a lot of stuff to like about the album and gave it 3 and a half stars. Kerrang UK called the album "disappointing" while also noting that there were brief "moments" in songs like "Satellite" and "Why Can't We Do It Again". They gave the album 2 out of 5 stars. Cryptic Rock gave The Trigger Complex 5 stars while noting that the band delivered on their aim for the album.

Tracklist

Credits
T.S.O.L.
 Jack Grisham – vocals, composition
 Chip Hanna – drums
 Greg Kuehn – keyboards, piano, composition
 Mike Roche – bass guitar, composition
 Ron Emory – guitars, composition

Non-Members
 Frank Agnew – guitar, backing vocals, composition
 Beth Carmellini – backing vocals
 Alex Deyoung – mastering
 Jenni McElrath – backing vocals
 Paul Roessler – keyboards, production, backing vocals, mixing

References

2017 albums
Rise Records albums
Gothic rock albums by American artists
T.S.O.L. albums
Hard rock albums by American artists